Novozyryanovo is a rural locality (a selo) and the administrative center of Novozyryanovsky Selsoviet, Zarinsky District, Altai Krai, Russia. The population was 538 as of 2013. There are 9 streets.

Geography 
Novozyryanovo is located 20 km north of Zarinsk (the district's administrative centre) by road. Zarinsk is the nearest rural locality.

References 

Rural localities in Zarinsky District